Take Twelve is an album by jazz trumpeter Lee Morgan originally released on the Jazzland label.  It was recorded on January 24, 1962, and features performances by Morgan with Clifford Jordan, Barry Harris, Bob Cranshaw and Louis Hayes.

Reception
The Allmusic review by Scott Yanow awarded the album 4 stars stating "The superior material uplifts the set from being a mere "blowing" date but it generally has the spontaneity of a jam session. It's one of Lee Morgan's lesser-known dates.".

Track listing 
 "Raggedy Ann" - 6:46  
 "A Waltz for Fran" - 4:55  
 "Lee-Sure Time" - 8:27  
 "Little Spain" (Jordan) - 7:45  
 "Take Twelve" (Elmo Hope) - 4:55  
 "Second's Best" -  7:08  
 "Second's Best" [alternate take] - 7:29 Bonus track on CD reissue  
All compositions by Lee Morgan except as indicated

Personnel 
 Lee Morgan - trumpet
 Clifford Jordan - tenor saxophone
 Barry Harris - piano
 Bob Cranshaw - bass
 Louis Hayes - drums

Notes

Hard bop albums
Lee Morgan albums
1962 albums
Albums produced by Orrin Keepnews
Jazzland Records (1960) albums